Bidher is a village and union council, an administrative subdivision, of Chakwal District in the Punjab Province of Pakistan, it is part of Talagang Tehsil.

Mr. Abdul Sattar Shah (late) was the leading and most respectful personality of Bidher in
the 20th century. He was a scholar, having a good knowledge of Islam, history, law and languages
such as Arabic and Persian. He was very much influential in Bidher and adjacent areas. Most
of the time, he played an important role as arbitrator for controversial issues and the clashes among the local people of Talagang. He was also looking after many Islamic schools in Talagang.
     
Mr. Abdul Rauf (1945–2008) s/o Mr. Abdul Sattar Shah (late) was also a renowned scientist of Pakistan. He served Pakistan Atomic Energy Commission as a Research Specialist in "Health and
physics".
     
Engineer Saqib Rauf and Dr. Atif Rauf are sons of Mr. Abdul Rauf (late). Engr Saqib
Rauf is head of Contracts Section in Attock Refinery Limited and Dr. Atif Rauf is doing practice in UK. Engr Saqib Rauf is also having a strong political stature in politics of Talagang and running a network with name of "Talagang Awami Council". He is Office bearer of main right wing party "Jamaat e Islami".

References

Union councils of Chakwal District
Populated places in Chakwal District